Acanthochondria limandae is a species of copepods in the genus Acanthochondria. They are host-specific ectoparasites of two species of flatfish: the common dab (Limanda limanda) and the European flounder (Platichthys flesus). They attach themselves to the bases of the gill arches of their hosts. They can infest as much as 2 to 30% of fish in a given population.

Acanthochondria limandae is classified under the family Chondracanthidae in the copepod order Poecilostomatoida. It was first described by the Danish zoologist Henrik Nikolai Krøyer in 1863 as Chondracanthus limandae.

References 

Poecilostomatoida
Parasitic crustaceans
Ectoparasites
Animal parasites of fish
Taxa named by Henrik Nikolai Krøyer
Crustaceans described in 1863